Mỹ Thủy a town and rural commune (xã) in Lệ Thủy District, Quảng Bình Province, North Central Coast region of Vietnam. This commune is located on the right bank of Kiến Giang River. The commune contains villages: Mỹ Trạch (where Mỹ Trạch Massacre was conducted by French army on 29 November 1947), My Ha, Thuan Trach, Mỹ Sơn. The commune governmental office is located in Mỹ Trạch village.

As of 2009, this commune has a population of 5,011 inhabitants, an area of 13.64 square kilometers.
The Hanoi–Saigon Railway crosses this communes with a stop in Mỹ Trạch Railway Station, 40 km south of Đồng Hới Railway Station.

The commune borders the following communes: Dương Thủy, Liên Thủy and Mai Thủy (opposite to other bank of Kiến Giang River).

References

Communes of Quảng Bình province
Populated places in Quảng Bình province